Bruchenbrücken station is a railway station in the municipality of Bruchenbrücken, located in the Wetteraukreis district in Hesse, Germany.

References

Railway stations in Hesse
Rhine-Main S-Bahn stations
Buildings and structures in Wetteraukreis